Jeff Zacks is an American psychologist, currently at Washington University in St. Louis and an Elected Fellow of the American Association for the Advancement of Science.

References

Year of birth missing (living people)
Living people
Fellows of the American Association for the Advancement of Science
21st-century American psychologists
Stanford University alumni
Yale College alumni
Washington University in St. Louis faculty